Robbie Dunne (born 5 October 1969) is an Irish  former soccer player who played for Dundalk in the League of Ireland First Division.
Dunne made two appearances for UCD in the 2000 UEFA Intertoto Cup against PFC Velbazhd Kyustendil as the students went out on away goals.

Honours
League of Ireland First Division: 1
 Dublin City - 2003

References 

Republic of Ireland association footballers
Association football midfielders
Living people
1979 births
Association footballers from County Dublin
University College Dublin A.F.C. players
Cobh Ramblers F.C. players
St Patrick's Athletic F.C. players
Drogheda United F.C. players
Bray Wanderers F.C. players
Dundalk F.C. players
League of Ireland players
Belvedere F.C. players